The Essential Kinks is a two disc compilation album by English rock band the Kinks, released on October 14, 2014, on Legacy Records, a division of Sony Music Entertainment.

Background
The album celebrates the Kinks' 50th anniversary of their first release with RCA Records. The album includes all the Kinks' biggest hits from 1964 to 1993. It was released as part of Sony's The Essential series and contains 48 tracks. The liner notes were written by David Bowie.

The Davies brothers, who had not played together since 1996, revealed in early 2014 that they had met in person and put their animosity behind them. They were writing new compositions and discussing the possibility of playing together again.

Sony has acquired exclusive licensing to the North American rights to albums made by the Kinks for both RCA Records and Arista between 1971 and 1985. Hi-resolution digital downloads, including Muswell Hillbillies from 1971, Preservation Act 1 from 1973, Preservation Act 2 from 1974, and State of Confusion were released on 9 September 2014.

Reception 

 Tony Peters from Iconfetch said, "This marks the first time that the entire Kinks’ 50-year journey has been captured on a single collection.  Yet, even if you already own all of their material, you’re going to want this one – the improvement in sound is just that good. The Kinks sound monstrous in this new career-spanning collection. With all the negative talk about the music business lately, it’s easy to overlook the good things still happening. A fine example of this is the recently-issued, two-disc set, The Essential Kinks."
 Pat Francis from Pop Culture said, "When a band has 40 years of recorded history under its belt it is almost impossible to whittle that amount of music down to a definitive 2 CD collection but the just released The Essential Kinks comes pretty close. Classics such as 'All Day And All Of The Night,' 'Waterloo Sunset' and 'Picture Book' prove why The Kinks are revered by musicians and music fanatics all over the world."

Track listing

Disc one

Disc two

Personnel 
 Ray Davies – vocals, guitar, keyboards 
 Dave Davies – vocals, guitar, keyboards 
 Andy Pyle – bass (tracks: 2-11) 
 Jim Rodford – bass (tracks: 2-12 to 2-21) 
 John Dalton – bass (tracks: 1-22 to 1-27, 2-1 to 2-9) 
 Pete Quaife – bass (tracks: 1-1 to 1-21) 
 Ron Lawrence – bass (tracks: 2-10) 
 Bob Henrit – drums (tracks: 2-19 to 2-21)
 Mick Avory – drums (tracks: 1-1 to 1-27, 2-1 to 2-9, 2-11 to 2-18)
 Nick Trevisick – drums (tracks: 2-10) 
 Ian Gibbons – keyboards (tracks: 2-13 to 2-21)
 John Gosling – keyboard (tracks: 1-23 to 1-27, 2-1 to 2-11) 
 Nick Newell – keyboards, percussion (tracks: 2-13, 2-14)

Release history

References 

The Kinks compilation albums
2014 compilation albums
RCA Records compilation albums
Arista Records compilation albums
Legacy Recordings compilation albums
Albums produced by Ray Davies
Albums produced by Shel Talmy